Kiptoo is a given name and surname of Kenyan, kalenjin origin meaning either born when visitors arrive or during visitation, or son of "Too". that may refer to:

Albert Kiptoo Yator (1993–2011), Kenyan steeplechase runner
Benjamin Kiptoo (born 1979), Kenyan marathon runner and 2011 Paris Marathon winner
Edwin Kiptoo (born 1993), Kenyan long-distance runner
Mark Kiptoo (born 1976), Kenyan long-distance track runner and 2012 African champion
Philip Kiptoo Tunoi, Kenyan lawyer and Supreme Court justice
Robert Kiptoo Kipkorir, Kenyan politician and Member of the National Assembly
Jane Kiptoo (born 1982), Kenyan female marathon runner

References

Kalenjin names